Gaines High School was a high school for African Americans and also later served as a normal school training teachers in Cincinnati, Ohio. It opened in 1866 and was named for school board member John I. Gaines, an advocate of schools for African Americans in Ohio. It was one of Ohio's first public high schools for African Americans. Peter H. Clark and then William H. Parham served as its principals. The year of the school's closure is uncertain; sources say 1887 or 1890. A historical marker commemorates the school. 

Clark introduced baseball as part of the school's program.

Clark became a Socialist and joined the Democratic Party, costing him support in the African American community and his job.

Privately funded Gilmore High School, also known as Cincinnati High School or Cincinnati High School for Colored People, preceded it.

John Isom Gaines
John Isom Gaines (November 6, 1821 - November 28, 1859) was an abolitionist and an advocate for African American rights and education in Ohio. He helped get a law passed in Ohio for the establishment of schools for African Americans. Gaines High School in Cincinnati was named for him. He abstained for drinking alcoholic beverages and was an advocate for temperance.

He gave speeches.

References

External links
The historical marker at Remarkable Ohio

High schools in Hamilton County, Ohio
Educational institutions established in 1866
Educational institutions disestablished in 1887
Educational institutions disestablished in 1890
1867 establishments in Ohio